David Foster has been credited with composing, producing, arranging, performing, programming numerous singles and albums.

Albums

Studio albums

Live albums

Compilation albums

Video works

Singles

Production credits

Songs
Foster has been credited with composing (only for first released version, not include cover version except performed or produced by Foster himself), producing, arranging, performing on the following songs: (not include sampling)

References

 
 
Foster, David